Koynanagar is a town in Maharashtra, India. It is situated on the Chiplun-Sangli state highway on the banks of Koyna River. The town is small but famous for Koyna Dam and the Koyna Hydroelectric Project which is the largest completed hydroelectric project of India. An earthquake in 1967 flattened the city.

References

Cities and towns in Satara district